Porculus is a genus of beetles in the family Ciidae, containing the following species:

 Porculus brunneus (Mellié, 1849)
 Porculus dufoui (Pic, 1922)
 Porculus grossus Lawrence, 1987
 Porculus piceus (Mellié, 1849)
 Porculus vianai (Pic, 1940)

References

Ciidae genera